Musaab Omer Maaz Mussa (born 4 June 1984 in Wad Medani, Sudan) is Sudanese footballer, who plays for home club Al-Merreikh in Sudanese Premier League and Sudan national football team, as a defender and midfielder. He was called to 2012 Africa Cup of Nations.

References

External links 
 

1984 births
Living people
Sudanese footballers
Sudan international footballers
2012 Africa Cup of Nations players
Al-Merrikh SC players
People from Al Jazirah (state)
Association football defenders
Association football midfielders
Sudan A' international footballers
2011 African Nations Championship players